Derasmosaurus is an extinct species of rhynchocephalian known from the Pietraroja Plattenkalk of Italy.  It was originally considered to be a specimen of  Lacerta brevicauda by Costa in 1866, it was later considered a specimen of  the lizard Chometokadmon fitzingeri by D'Erasmo in 1915. It was described as a distinct rhynchocephalian genus in 1988. It is distinct from other indeterminate rhychocephalians found in the Plattenkalk. It is considered to be aquatically adapted, and possibly a member of the Pleurosauridae.

References 

Cretaceous lepidosaurs
Early Cretaceous reptiles of Europe
Prehistoric reptile genera